Yuuki Hashiguchi (born 8 June 1994) is a Japanese judoka.

He is the gold medallist of the 2017 Judo Grand Prix Zagreb in the -66 kg category.

References

External links
 

1994 births
Living people
Japanese male judoka